Jacques Marcotte is a Canadian politician. He was a member of the National Assembly of Quebec for the riding of Portneuf, first elected in the 2012 election. He was defeated in the 2014 election.

Prior to his election to the legislature, Marcotte served as mayor of Sainte-Catherine-de-la-Jacques-Cartier from 1996 to 2012.

References

External links
 

Living people
Coalition Avenir Québec MNAs
Mayors of places in Quebec
People from Capitale-Nationale
21st-century Canadian politicians
Year of birth missing (living people)